Maenggolgundo, also Maenggol Kundo, are an archipelago consisting of the three inhabited islands (from north to south) Jukdo (죽도), Maenggoldo (맹골도), and Gwakdo (곽도), and the uninhabited islets Myeongdo (명도), Mongdeokdo (몽덕도), and Sojukdo (소죽도).

Maenggolgundo are the outermost inhabited islands in the western extremity of Jindo County, South Jeolla Province, in the administrative division of Maenggoldo-ri, Jodo-myeon.

References

External links 
 

Archipelagoes of South Korea
Jindo County
Islands of South Jeolla Province
Islands of the Yellow Sea